Bhima Jewels Comedy Festival, commonly referred to as Comedy Festival is a comedy reality show which is sponsored by Bhima Jewels and was repeatedly aired in Mazhavil Manorama four times a day. It is anchored by Rachana Narayanankutty and Devika Nambiar hosted the second season . The judges vary because of film shootings which lead to their inconvenience to arrive at the shooting of the programme on time. The chief judges are Siddique, Urvashi, and Ajaykumar.

Judges
 Siddique
 Urvashi
 Ajaykumar
 Lal
 Suraj Venjaramood
 Bijukuttan
Rekha
Miya George

Schedule and timing
The time of the programme is 30 minutes. The program has two repeats in the morning and evening everyday including weekends.

Rounds
The programme has two rounds. Each round has a topic associated with it. The skits have to be presented by teams according to the topics. The rounds are :-
 Oru Vattom Kudi round: Teams can decide the topic of their choice
 Lal Choice round         : Based on Lal (actor)'s horror films, the skit should be horror based.

Season One 
Winners of Season one is Stars of Kochin

References

External links
 Mazhavil Manorama's official website

Comedy festivals in India
Malayalam-language television shows
Mazhavil Manorama original programming